Gian-Carlo Pascutto (born 1982) is a Belgian computer programmer. He is the author of chess engine Sjeng and Go software Leela, and the original author of the free and open-source Go software Leela Zero. Gian-Carlo also authored many core components of the foobar2000 media player.
	
He graduated from Hogeschool Gent in 2006, and has worked as a mobile platform engineer and manager at Mozilla Corporation since 2011.

Pascutto is a native of Ninove. He is married and has two children.

References

External links
GCP (Gian-Carlo Pascutto) on GitHub

1982 births
Living people
Belgian computer programmers
Computer chess people